New African Poets (NAP) are a French hip hop group from Strasbourg. The members of the group are Mustapha, Bilal, Malik, Aïssa, Mohammed and Karim. Most of the group come from the Neuhof quartier of Strasbourg. They have been rapping together since 1988. Brothers Malik and Bilal produced the group's first album. Aïssa is their cousin.

Discography
 Trop beau pour être vrai (1994)
 La racaille sort un disque (1996)
 La fin du monde (1998)
 Le Boulevard des Rêves Brisés EP (1999)
 Le ghetto pleure (2000)

French hip hop groups
Rappers from Bas-Rhin
Organizations based in Strasbourg
Musical groups from Grand Est